Burqueño and the feminine Burqueña are demonyms from Chicano slang (Caló), used to refer to a person who is from or lives in Albuquerque, New Mexico, and the surrounding Albuquerque metropolitan area. Burqueño is also sometimes used as an adjective for anything related to that city. Sometimes it is used specifically to refer to someone who identifies with a New Mexico prison gang or a barrio of Albuquerque.

See also 
 Burqueño English, a sub-variety of English in New Mexico

Demonyms
Spanish words and phrases
Hispanic and Latino American culture in Albuquerque, New Mexico